Yei River County is an administrative area in Central Equatoria with large population of people who settled in the area

Aggrey Cyrus Kanyikwa is the current commissioner for Yei River County. He was appointed by President Salva Kiir Mayardit as recommended by Central Equatoria State Governor, Emmanuel Adil Anthony.

Demography 

Yei River County is divided into smaller sub-regions (payams). As of January 2023, there are 5 payams: the Yei Town payam, the Otogo payam, the Mugwo payam, the Tore payam, and the Lasu payam.The county was divided into four counties in April 2016, however, in 2020 the divided counties were all reverted back and merged into Greater Yei River County. As follows below

 Lainya
 moro
 koji kajiya

Geography, economy, and humanitarian status 
Yei River County is located in the state of Central Equatoria. It is bordered to the east by Lainya County, to the south by Morobo County, and to the north by Western Equatoria State (Maridi and Mundri West Counties). It shares a long western border with the Democratic Republic of the Congo. The county is distinguished by hills and dense forest cover. Several rivers, including the River Yei, flow north through the county in the western and eastern parts.

The county is located in the equatorial maize and cassava livelihoods zone, according to FEWSNET (2018). According to an FAO and WFP report from 2018, 30% of the county's households depended on agriculture (p.19).  Furthermore, Yei County's soil and climate make it an ideal location for agricultural activities. Following the outbreak of conflict in 2016, Yei County experienced one of the country's largest drops in harvested areas, with the county's cereal harvest dropping from surplus to deficit. Before 2016, Yei had a high incoming population from neighboring states and countries. The presence of the Yei River in the area also allows residents to pursue fishing as a source of income, though access is limited due to extended periods of insecurity in the area.

According to IPC projections, the county had Minimal (IPC Phase 1) levels of food insecurity in 2016. However, due to the second outbreak of conflict in South Sudan, IPC projects classified the country as being in Crisis (IPC Phase 3) for the first half of the year. Insecurity in the county limited farmers' access to land and also hampered trade routes, which were critical for small businesses to survive.

According to OCHA's (2019) Humanitarian Needs Overview for 2020, there are approximately 224,000 people in the country who have significant humanitarian needs, including IDPs. This corresponds to approximately 83% of the HNO's estimated population. Because of access issues, humanitarian organizations were unable to provide critical services to many vulnerable populations in Yei County in 2019, exacerbating the population's humanitarian needs. The county's protection needs were described as "catastrophic," with one of the highest levels of contamination of landmines/explosive remnants of war (ERW), gender-based violence, and child protection concerns in the country.

Infrastructure and services 
The county's administrative center is in Yei Town Payam. Yei River County is on South Sudan's southern border, connecting it to trade routes through Uganda and the Democratic Republic of the Congo. Following independence, Yei River County was regarded as a stable area with significant development in terms of government institutions, educational facilities, and healthcare. However, sustained insecurity in the area, as well as in neighboring counties, has had a significant impact on all of these, and insecurity along the Juba-Yei road has impacted trade routes that support the economy. Due to this, access to the county has been greatly reduced. Humanitarian organizations and residents enter the area from the Ugandan side of the border.

Prior to the outbreak of conflict, Yei's infrastructure was gradually being developed, but the conflict has hampered further investment. Although Yei does not have a hospital, it does have well-served clinics, some of which are funded by international aid. Yei is also home to the Yei Teacher Training College, one of only a few such institutions in South Sudan. The institution, which was founded in 2001 by the Episcopal Diocese of Yei, has drawn students from all over the country (Yei TTC, 2020). The Lantoto National Park is located in the county's west, but its precise boundaries are unknown, and illegal poaching has been a persistent problem exacerbated by insecurity.

Conflict dynamics 
The region has historically been an SPLA stronghold, and Yei River County was relatively unscathed after the conflict began in December 2013. However, due to its infrastructure and proximity to the border, it became a site for IDP hosting as hundreds of Nuer IDPs sought refuge in counties such as Yei River, where they were protected by the government in the former UNMISS compound. These IDPs (661 in Yei River County) were mostly families of soldiers who had defected to join the opposition.  Following the outbreak of fighting in these counties in May 2015, approximately 3,000 IDPs from Mundri and Maridi sought refuge in Yei. Yei River County has also served as a refugee settlement for those fleeing neighboring countries, particularly the Democratic Republic of the Congo.

Due to the continued presence of armed rebel groups in the area and neighbouring counties, the situation in Yei County changed significantly following the escalation of conflict in 2016. This resulted in significant internal displacement as well as migration across international borders, primarily to Uganda. While there is no official Protection of Civilians (PoC) site in Yei, there are ad hoc displacement sites and IDPs living among the host community in the area. According to the most recent data from early 2020, Yei is home to approximately 67,511 IDPs and 10,097 returnees (IOM DTM, 2020).

The National Salvation Front (NAS), led by Thomas Cirillo, has clashed with the South Sudan People's Defense Force in the area on numerous occasions and is not a signatory to the 2018 peace agreement. Clashes were reported as recently as May 2020 (Abraham, 2020), and as a result, the area's future security remains uncertain. In addition to the civil war, land disputes caused by migration to the area have strained relations between the host community and those who have settled in the county.

Roads 

Roads: There are four primary roads from Yei.

 Northwest to Rasolo payam of Maridi County – conditions were unknown during the rainy season in 2019, and the route was labeled with “road warning” during the dry season.
 Northeast to Lainya County and Juba – accessible for vehicles during the dry season in 2019, however “road warnings” were issued during the rainy season. This road had experienced significant insecurity following the outbreak of conflict in 2016, due to the presence of different armed factions in the area. Since the signing of the peace agreement in 2018, such incidents have reduced although public transport along the road still relies on security measures such as escorts and traveling in convoys
 South to Morobo County – conditions unknown for the rainy season in 2019, however he road through limited accessibility with “road warnings” during the dry season.
 East to Kajo-Keji County – conditions unknown for the rainy season in 2019, however parts of the road through Lainya County had limited accessibility with “road warnings” during the dry season.
 The primary road heading to the border with Uganda was labeled with “road warning” during the dry season in 2019, and the condition was unknown during the rainy season.
 A secondary road runs southwest from Yei to the border with DRC, however seasonal conditions are unknown.

References

External links 
SPECIAL REPORT: FAO/WFP CROP AND FOOD SECURITY ASSESSMENT - MISSION TO SOUTH SUDAN - 28 March 2018
Lacha Community and Economic Development (LCED)
Initial Rapid Needs Assessment: Juba (Bungu and Ganji Payams), Lainya and Yei Counties, Central Equatoria State, 5 - 6 February 2014
Handling land conflict in Yei, South Sudan - MID Thesis report By Marlien de Jong December 2012
https://iomsouthsudan.org/tracking/sites/default/publicfiles/documents/CES_Yei_ATLAS.pdf

Counties of South Sudan